Cloud Wan Ho-ying (born 5 July 1997), is a Hong Kong singer and actress. She is known for joining ViuTV's reality talent competition King Maker III in 2020. She received most audiences' votes in final and finished 4th in the competition. She signed a record deal with Media Asia Music and made her solo debut on 5 May 2022 with the single "Wing Of Desire".

Early life
Cloud Wan was a member of child group "Honey Bees" formed by Nancy Sit's art school when she was thirteen. She was working in an office before joining the King Maker III competition, she was still working in an office after the competition. Later, she decided to be a full-time singer.

Discography

Extended plays 
 The Cloud (2022)
Track Listing:
1. Wing of Desire
2. Distancing
3. Close Contact
4. Flow (Feat. AF)
5. Nothing (English Track)
6. Hand Hold (English Track)

Filmography

Television Show

Movie

Videography

Music videos

Awards and nominations

References

External links
Cloud Wan's Facebook

Cloud Wan's Official Youtube Playlist

1997 births
Living people
Alumni of the City University of Hong Kong
King Maker III contestants
Cantopop singers
English-language singers from Hong Kong
21st-century Hong Kong women singers
Hong Kong idols
Hong Kong film actresses
Media Asia Music Artists